Jean-Renaud Nemouthé (born 27 June 1981 in Cayenne, French Guiana) is a French retired footballer who played as a midfielder.

Club career
After starting with amateurs FC Les Lilas, Nemouthé signed for Paris FC, where he played for five years. In 2006–07 he moved to Portugal, splitting the season between Vitória de Guimarães (second division) and Moreirense FC (third level).

For the 2007–08 campaign Nemouthé returned to Portugal's second tier, joining S.C. Freamunde. However, after having appeared just twice in the league, he returned to France, signing with Villemomble Sports in January 2008.

In 2009–10 Nemouthé continued in the French lower leagues, after moving to Entente Sportive de Viry-Châtillon. He retired in 2011, aged 30.

External links

1981 births
Living people
Sportspeople from Cayenne
French footballers
Association football midfielders
FC Les Lilas players
Paris FC players
Villemomble Sports players
ES Viry-Châtillon players
Liga Portugal 2 players
Segunda Divisão players
Vitória S.C. players
Moreirense F.C. players
S.C. Freamunde players
French expatriate footballers
Expatriate footballers in Portugal
French expatriate sportspeople in Portugal